Michael Reventar is a Canadian actor. He is best known for his appearance as Farooq Gibran / Blackout in The Flash, and for the film Kidnap Capital, for which he received a Canadian Screen Award nomination as Best Supporting Actor at the 5th Canadian Screen Awards.

Early life
Reventar was born in Scarborough, Ontario.

Career

Filmography

Film

Television

References

External links
 

Living people
Canadian male film actors
Canadian male television actors
Male actors from Toronto
People from Scarborough, Toronto
Year of birth missing (living people)